Fantastic Damage is the first solo studio album by American hip hop artist El-P. It was released through Definitive Jux on May 14, 2002. It peaked at number 198 on the Billboard 200 chart. Music videos were created for "Stepfather Factory" and "Deep Space 9mm".

Fandam Plus: Instrumentals, Remixes, Lyrics & Video was released through Definitive Jux on October 1, 2002.

Production
The majority of Fantastic Damage was made after the breakup of El-P's previous group Company Flow. El-P recorded the album in his bedroom in Brooklyn using turntables, an Ensoniq EPS-16 Plus sampler, a Kaoss Pad and an Oberheim OB12 synthesizer. According to El-P, he primarily used a DA-88 and "barely touched ProTools." It took over a year and a half to record the album.

Public Enemy was a big influence on El-P's production style on the album. The album contains references to  Philip K. Dick and George Orwell, who El-P credits as influences on his worldview and lyrics.

Critical reception

Steve Huey of AllMusic wrote, "Fantastic Damage constitutes some of the most challenging, lyrically dense hip-hop around, assembled by one of the genre's true independent mavericks." Kathryn McGuire of Rolling Stone called it "a heavy, turbulent affair."

Pitchfork placed Fantastic Damage at number 11 on its list of the top albums of 2002, while Spin placed it at number 27 on its list of the year's best albums. In 2015, Fact placed it at number 21 on its "100 Best Indie Hip-Hop Records of All Time" list.

Although interpreted as a "post-9/11 record" which channeled the feelings of New Yorkers and Americans after the September 11 attacks, the album was written and largely recorded before September 11, 2001.

Track listing

Personnel
Credits adapted from liner notes.

 El-P – vocals, production, recording, mixing, art direction
 Aesop Rock – vocals (6)
 Ill Bill – vocals (6)
 Rob Sonic – vocals (7)
 Vast Aire – vocals (8, 12)
 Cage – vocals (9)
 Camu Tao – vocals (9)
 Nasa – vocals (15), recording, mixing
 C-Rayz Walz – vocals (16)
 Mr. Lif – vocals (16)
 DJ Abilities – turntables
 Dan Ezra Lang – art direction, design, painting
 Alexander Calder – painting
 Phase Two – painting

Charts

References

External links
 
 

2002 debut albums
Definitive Jux albums
El-P albums
Albums produced by El-P